"Still Loving You" is a power ballad by the German hard rock band Scorpions. It was released in June 1984 as the second single from their ninth studio album, Love at First Sting (1984). The song reached number 64 on the Billboard Hot 100. It was most successful in Europe, reaching the top 5 in several countries.

Background
In an interview with Songfacts, Rudolf Schenker explained, "It's a story about a love affair, where they recognized it may be over, but let's try again".

Music video
The music video was released on 3 July 1984, and was filmed in Dallas, Texas at Reunion Arena.

In the media 
The song can be heard in the police procedural television series Cold Case, in the episode "It's Raining Men" (2004). "Still Loving You" is also featured in the television show Patinando por un sueño and Polish comedy film Gotowi na wszystko. Exterminator (2018).

Track listing

Original version (1984)
Single (Harvest 20 0329 7)
 "Still Loving You" - 4:48
 "Holiday" - 6:31 (taken from the album Lovedrive)

Remix (1992)
CD single (Harvest 1 C 560-204675-2)
 "Still Loving You" (Remix) – 6:12
 "Still Loving You" (Radio edit) – 3:58
 "Media Overkill" – 3:34 (taken from the album Savage Amusement)

Personnel
Klaus Meine - lead and background vocals
Rudolf Schenker - lead guitar
Matthias Jabs - rhythm guitar
Francis Buchholz - bass guitar
Herman Rarebell - drums, percussion

Charts and certification

Weekly charts

Year-end charts

Certifications

Other versions
A remixed version of the studio album version was included on Scorpions' 1992 album Still Loving You. The remixed version was also released as a single in Germany and some other European countries.
A symphonic metal version of the song, featuring the Berlin Philharmonic Orchestra, was recorded for Scorpions' 2000 album Moment of Glory.
An unplugged version was recorded for Scorpions' 2001 album Acoustica.
A "sequel" of the song was recorded for Scorpions' 2010 album Sting in the Tail, entitled "SLY", an acronym for "Still Loving You".
Two versions of the song were recorded for Scorpions' 2011 album Comeblack: a regular version and a Frenglish version featuring Amandine Bourgeois.

References

External links
 Lyrics at Scorpions' official website

1984 songs
1984 singles
Scorpions (band) songs
Songs written by Klaus Meine
Songs written by Rudolf Schenker
Universal Music Group singles
1980s ballads
Glam metal ballads